Roepera similis (synonym Zygophyllum simile) is a succulent annual herb native to Australia.

Description
It grows as a prostrate or erect annual herb, branching from the base and reaching a height of from four to 60 centimeters. Flowers are yellow or white.

Taxonomy
Roepera similis was first described in 1990 by Hansjörg Eichler as Zygophyllum simile, based on a specimen has collected from the Musgrave Ranges in South Australia in 1963. It was transferred to the genus Roepera in 2003, when Zygophyllum as then circumscribed was found not to be monophyletic.

Distribution and habitat
It occurs in every mainland state of Australia, favouring red or grey sandy soils.

References

Zygophylloideae
Rosids of Western Australia
Flora of South Australia
Flora of the Northern Territory
Flora of Queensland
Flora of New South Wales
Flora of Victoria (Australia)
Succulent plants
Taxa named by Hansjörg Eichler
Plants described in 1990